E3 ubiquitin-protein ligase MARCH7 is an enzyme that in humans is encoded by the MARCH7 gene.

References

Further reading